Robert Long (1803–1907) was a British Anglican priest, most notably Archdeacon of Auckland from 1881 until his death.

Long was born in Norfolk, educated at Corpus Christi College, Cambridge and ordained in 1856. 1856; After a curacy at St George, Bloomsbury he held incumbencies in Chelsea, Erith, Bishop Auckland and Bishop Wearmouth.

References

1833 births
Alumni of Corpus Christi College, Cambridge
Archdeacons of Auckland
1907 deaths
Clergy from Norfolk
19th-century New Zealand Anglican priests
19th-century English Anglican priests
20th-century New Zealand Anglican priests